Leonard Darnell (14 September 1905–1968) was an English footballer who played in the Football League for Carlisle United, Reading and West Bromwich Albion.

References

1905 births
1968 deaths
English footballers
Association football midfielders
English Football League players
Rushden Town F.C. players
West Bromwich Albion F.C. players
Reading F.C. players
Carlisle United F.C. players